Miranda station or Francisco de Miranda station may refer to:

 Miranda station (Caracas), a rapid transit station in Caracas, Venezuela
 Miranda station (Valencia), a rapid transit station in Valencia, Venezuela

Miranda station may also refer to:
 Miranda railway station, a commuter rail station in Sydney, Australia